Cycas Hospitality BV is a hotel management company based in Amsterdam, in The Netherlands. The group has an estimated annual revenue currently $59.2M per year and employs 212 people. It operates in the UK, the Netherlands, Belgium, Denmark, France, Germany, and Switzerland.

History 
Cycas was founded in 2008 by John Wagner and Eduard Elias. In October 2017, the Thai family-owned Hua Kee Group acquired one third of the group for an undisclosed amount. In 2019, Matt Luscombe became the company's first official CEO.

Types of hotels
It operates in the extended-stay and mainstream hospitality sectors, including double-decker hotels, property development and asset management. Cycas manages hotels in the UK, the Netherlands, Belgium, Denmark, France, Germany, and Switzerland. Its global hospitality partners include InterContinental Hotels Group, Marriott International, Hyatt, Accor, Radisson Hotels and Hilton Hotels and Resorts.

Awards
Since 2018 it has won several industry awards for best employer, ranking in the Best Places to Work in Hospitality for five consecutive years. It has also been recognised for its inspiring leadership and its hotels' high service levels.

References

External links 

 www.cycashospitality.com

Companies based in Amsterdam
Hospitality companies established in 2008
Hospitality companies of the Netherlands